Jon Anderson (real name John Roy Anderson, born 1944) is a singer and musician with the rock band Yes.

Jon Anderson may also refer to:
Jon Anderson (athlete) (born 1949), American marathon runner
Jon Anderson (wrestler) (born 1984), American sport wrestler
Jon Anderson (poet) (1940–2007), American poet and author
Jon Anderson (journalist) (born 1958), Australian sports journalist
Jon Anderson (American football), American football coach and former player
Jon Lee Anderson (born 1957), biographer, author, reporter, and staff writer for The New Yorker
Jon Anderson, long-time partner and model of Paul Cadmus

See also
Jonathan Anderson (disambiguation)
Jon Andersen, American professional wrestler
Jon Øyvind Andersen, Norwegian black metal guitarist
John Anderson (disambiguation)